Diego Jara (born Concordia, Province of Entre Rios, Argentina, October 4, 1983) is an Argentine footballer. Plays as a striker for Club Atlético Patronato and its first equipment was Deportivo Las Heras Concordia.

Biography 
He started his career in Deportivo Las Heras but his blast was given in College Concordia, where he was top scorer and was Torneo Argentino B in 2007.

Board threw the eye, blew a Cruise North (Misiones) and hired him to replace another scorer, the Fool José Luis Marzo, an idol Tatengue. In the Torneo Argentino A, the tip was instrumental in the rise of 2009/2010 (26 goals, top scorer) and then she felt the handover to the National B:nailed 21 goals in a season and a half.

His great performance made several teams will have to list like Sporting Lisbon, Olympus, Columbus, Newell's, River Plate, among other Argentine and European clubs. But it was Union who eventually signed him for the Clausura 2012 tournament for the purchase of 80% of the pass to and transfer of Matías Quiroga for six months with an option to purchase, who after the transfer was transferred to Gymnastics silver. The contract "La Joya" with Union is two and a half years.

His first goal was scored against Racing, and also scored a goal in the classic Santa Fe for Union achieved a draw after trailing 2–0 against Columbus .

Currently playing in Atlético Tucumán, club which was given for 6 months. His first serious goal against Instituto de Cordoba in the tie 2–2, where the second shot 30 meters and became the second goal in the 3–0 win against Douglas Haig

Clubs

Statistics

External links 
 Ficha en BDFA
 Ficha en la página oficial de Unión

1983 births
Living people
Argentine footballers
Argentine Primera División players
Primera Nacional players
Torneo Argentino A players
Atlético Tucumán footballers
Unión de Santa Fe footballers
Club Atlético Patronato footballers
Association footballers not categorized by position
Sportspeople from Entre Ríos Province